Amelio is both a surname and a given name. This name derives from the Germanic-Gothic name “*amal / ama-l”, meaning “work, vigor, courage, brave, bold, diligent. Notable people with the name include:

Surname
Austin Amelio, American actor best known for his roles on The Walking Dead and Everybody Wants Some
Gianni Amelio (born 1945), Italian film director
Gil Amelio (born 1943), American technology executive
Lucio Amelio (1931–1994), Italian art dealer, curator, and actor
Philip Amelio (1977–2005), American actor and teacher
Sonia Amelio (born 1941), Mexican dancer, musician, choreographer, and actress
William Amelio, American business executive who held the position of CEO of Lenovo

Given name
Amelio Robles Ávila, colonel during the Mexican Revolution
Amelio Della Chiesa, American politician and mayor of Quincy, Massachusetts

See also
Ameli (disambiguation)
D'Amelio (disambiguation)
Amelia (disambiguation)

References